The Itá Hydroelectric Power Plant is a dam and hydroelectric power plant on the Uruguay River near Itá on the border of Santa Catarina and Rio Grande do Sul, Brazil. The power station has a  capacity and is supplied with water by a concrete face rock-fill embankment dam. It is owned and operated by Tractebel Energia and produces the equivalent of 60% of the energy consumed in Santa Catarina.

Background
Construction on Itá originally began in 1980 but was halted in 1987 because of financial conditions. In 1995, construction recommenced after a consortium was formed and the dam was complete in 2000. Most of the 6,000 people that were in the town of Itá were relocated to a new area above the reservoir.
The  Fritz Plaumann State Park was created in 2003 as environmental compensation for the dam.

Itá Dam
The dam supports two spillways, one of its right abutment with six floodgates and another on the ridge to the dam's west, just south of the power plant which has 4 floodgates. Also on the ridge is the power plant's intake and three axillary dikes to support the reservoir level.

Power plant
The first generator was commissioned in July 2000 and four more later that year with the last generator being commissioned in March 2001.

See also

List of power stations in Brazil

References

Energy infrastructure completed in 2001
Hydroelectric power stations in Brazil
Dams in Santa Catarina (state)
Dams in Rio Grande do Sul